Jassuda Bédarrides (2 April 1804 – 4 February 1882) was a French lawyer and politician. He served as the Mayor of Aix-en-Provence from 1848 to 1849. As such, he was the first Jewish Mayor of this city.

Biography

Early life
Jassuda Bédarrides was born in a Jewish family on April 2, 1804, in Aix-en-Provence. He had a brother, Salomon Bédarrides, who went on to serve as the Mayor of Aix-en-Provence from 1877 to 1884. He also had a sister, Précieuse Bédarrides, who married Abraham Abram, a Jewish businessman from Marseille; their son, Benjamin Abram (1846-1938), went on to serve as the Mayor of Aix-en-Provence from 1888 to 1896.

Career
He started his career as a lawyer, becoming the first Jewish lawyer in Aix-en-Provence. He wrote several books about jurisprudence. He also served as bâtonnier.

A supporter of the Republic, he embarked upon a career in politics. He served as the Mayor of Aix-en-Provence from March 12, 1848, to May 18, 1849. As such, he became the first Jewish Mayor of this city. In April 1848, he planted the Tree of Freedom on the Place des Precheurs to celebrate the French Republic. During his tenure, he also commissioned the construction of new buildings for factory workers and a new slaughterhouse (demolished and now the Pasino), as well as the restoration of a lycee and of a museum. He also served on the General Council

Later, he served as a member of the Consistory of Marseille. He also became an officer of the Legion of Honour on July 13, 1880.

Personal life
He resided at number 7 on the Rue Bellegarde (now known as the Rue Mignet) in Aix.

Death
He died on February 4, 1882, in Aix-en-Provence.

Legacy
The Rue Bédarrides in Aix-en-Provence is named in his honour and his brother's.

Bibliography
Traité des faillites et banqueroutes ou commentaire de la loi du 28 mai 1838
Traité du dol et de la fraude en matière civile et commerciale
De la lettre de change, des billets à ordre et de la prescription
Des achats et ventes
Des chemins de fer au point de vue du transport des voyageurs et des marchandises

References

1804 births
1882 deaths
Mayors of Aix-en-Provence
Jewish French politicians
19th-century French lawyers
Jewish mayors
Officiers of the Légion d'honneur